Fred R. Volkmar, M.D., is a psychiatrist, psychologist, and former director of the Yale Child Study Center.  He is the Irving B. Harris professor of child psychiatry, pediatrics, and psychology at the Yale School of Medicine and the head of child psychiatry at Yale-New Haven Hospital.

Personal life and education
Volkmar was raised in Sorento, Illinois.  He obtained a degree in psychology from the University of Illinois in 1972, and his M.D. and an M.A. in psychology from Stanford University in 1976.

Career

Medical
Volkmar was a resident and fellow at the Stanford University School of Medicine, joining Yale as a fellow in 1980. He became a professor at Yale in 1982.  He was board certified in psychiatry and in child and adolescent psychiatry in 1988.

Appointments
Volkmar was appointed director of the Yale Child Study Center in 2006 and served until 2014. He is the editor of Springer Publishing since 2007, and serves as editor for the Journal of Autism and Developmental Disorders.

Recognition and other achievements
While an undergraduate at the University of Illinois, Volkmar received the Psi Chi national prize for research.

Volkmar received the Blanche F. Ittleson Award from the American Psychiatric Association in 1997 and, in 2007, the George Tarjan Award for Research in Developmental Disabilities from the American Academy of Child and Adolescent Psychiatry.

Volkmar was the lead author of the section on autism in the fourth revision of the Diagnostic and Statistical Manual of Mental Disorders (DSM-IV).

References

Autism researchers
American child psychiatrists
Stanford University people
Yale School of Medicine faculty
Living people
Medical journal editors
Year of birth missing (living people)